Frederick A. Henninger (1865–1944), commonly known as F. A. Henninger, was a leading architect of Omaha, Nebraska.  He was born in 1865 at Albia, Iowa, and attended the Chicago Art Institute.  He moved from Chicago to Lincoln, Nebraska, and in 1891 to Omaha.  He worked as a draftsman for an architect in 1895 and purchased the practice in 1896.  He worked as an architect in Omaha until his retirement in 1937.  After retiring, he moved to Pasadena, California and died there in 1944.

A number of his works are listed on the National Register of Historic Places.

Works include:

References

Architects from Nebraska
Artists from Omaha, Nebraska
People from Pasadena, California
1944 deaths
1865 births
People from Albia, Iowa
Architects from Iowa
19th-century American architects
20th-century American architects
School of the Art Institute of Chicago alumni